Arcade Tri-County Airport  is a privately owned, public use airport located two nautical miles (4 km) north of Arcade, a village in the Town of Arcade, Wyoming County, New York, United States.

Facilities and aircraft 
Arcade Tri-County Airport covers an area of 175 acres (71 ha) at an elevation of 1,745 feet (532 m) above mean sea level. It has two runways: 9/27 is 3,220 by 60 feet (981 x 18 m) with a gravel surface and 14/32 is 2,710 by 80 feet (826 x 24 m) with a turf surface.

For the 12-month period ending September 9, 2010, the airport had 1,900 general aviation aircraft operations, an average of 158 per month. At that time there were three aircraft based at this airport, all single-engine.

References

External links 
 Arcade Tri-County Airport (D23) at NYSDOT Airport Directory
 Aerial image as of April 1994 from USGS The National Map
 

Airports in New York (state)
Buildings and structures in Wyoming County, New York